Harvard University is a private Ivy League research university in Cambridge, Massachusetts. Founded in 1636 as Harvard College and named for its first benefactor, the Puritan clergyman John Harvard, it is the oldest institution of higher learning in the United States and is widely considered to be one of the most prestigious universities in the world.

Harvard's founding was authorized by the Massachusetts colonial legislature, "dreading to leave an illiterate ministry to the churches, when our present ministers shall lie in the dust"; though never formally affiliated with any denomination, in its early years Harvard College primarily trained Congregational clergy. Its curriculum and student body were gradually secularized during the 18th century. By the 19th century, Harvard emerged as the most prominent academic and cultural institution among the Boston elite. Following the American Civil War, under President Charles William Eliot's long tenure (1869–1909), the college developed multiple affiliated professional schools that transformed the college into a modern research university. In 1900, Harvard co-founded the Association of American Universities. James B. Conant led the university through the Great Depression and World War II, and liberalized admissions after the war.

The university is composed of ten academic faculties plus Harvard Radcliffe Institute. The Faculty of Arts and Sciences offers study in a wide range of undergraduate and graduate academic disciplines, and other faculties offer only graduate degrees, including professional degrees. Harvard has three main campuses:
the  Cambridge campus centered on Harvard Yard; an adjoining campus immediately across Charles River in the Allston neighborhood of Boston; and the medical campus in Boston's Longwood Medical Area. Harvard's endowment is valued at $50.9 billion, making it the wealthiest academic institution in the world.  Endowment income enables the undergraduate college to admit students regardless of financial need and provide generous financial aid with no loans. Harvard Library is the world's largest academic library system, comprising 79 individual libraries holding 20 million items.

Throughout its existence, Harvard alumni, faculty, and researchers have included numerous heads of state, including eight United States presidents, 79 Nobel laureates, 48 Pulitzer Prize winners, seven Fields Medalists, members of Congress, MacArthur Fellows, Rhodes Scholars, Marshall Scholars, and Fulbright Scholars; by most metrics, Harvard ranks at the top, or near the top, of all universities globally in each of these categories. Its alumni include eight U.S. presidents and 188 living billionaires, the most of any university. Fourteen Turing Award laureates have been Harvard affiliates. Students and alumni have won 10 Academy Awards, 48 Pulitzer Prizes, and 110 Olympic medals (46 gold), and they have founded many notable companies.

History

Colonial era

Harvard was established in 1636 in the colonial, pre-Revolutionary era by vote of the Great and General Court of Massachusetts Bay Colony. In 1638, the university acquired British North America's first known printing press. 

In 1639, it was named Harvard College after John Harvard, an English clergyman who had died soon after immigrating to Massachusetts, bequeathed it £780 and his library of some 320 volumes. The charter creating Harvard Corporation was granted in 1650.

A 1643 publication defined the university's purpose: "to advance learning and perpetuate it to posterity, dreading to leave an illiterate ministry to the churches when our present ministers shall lie in the dust." The college trained many Puritan ministers in its early years
and offered a classic curriculum that was based on the English university modelmany leaders in the colony had attended the University of Cambridgebut also conformed to the tenets of Puritanism. While Harvard never affiliated with any particular denomination, many of its earliest graduates went on to become Puritan clergymen.

Increase Mather served as Harvard College's president from 1681 to 1701. In 1708, John Leverett became the first president who was not also a clergyman, marking a turning of the college away from Puritanism and toward intellectual independence.

19th century 
 

In the 19th century, Enlightenment ideas of reason and free will were widespread among Congregational ministers, putting those ministers and their congregations at odds with more traditionalist, Calvinist parties. When Hollis Professor of Divinity David Tappan died in 1803 and President Joseph Willard died a year later, a struggle broke out over their replacements. Henry Ware was elected Hollis chair in 1805, and liberal Samuel Webber was appointed president two years later, signaling a shift from traditional ideas at Harvard to liberal, Arminian ideas.

Charles William Eliot, Harvard president from 1869–1909, eliminated the favored position of Christianity from the curriculum while opening it to student self-direction. Though Eliot was an influential figure in the secularization of American higher education, he was motivated more by Transcendentalist Unitarian convictions influenced by William Ellery Channing, Ralph Waldo Emerson, and others of the time than by secularism.

In 1816, Harvard launched new programs in the study of French and Spanish with George Ticknor as first professor for these language programs.

20th century 

Harvard's graduate schools began admitting women in small numbers in the late 19th century. During World War II, students at Radcliffe College (which, since its 1879 founding, had been paying Harvard professors to repeat their lectures for women) began attending Harvard classes alongside men. In 1945, women were first admitted to the medical school.
Since 1971, Harvard had controlled essentially all aspects of undergraduate admission, instruction, and housing for Radcliffe women; in 1999, Radcliffe was formally merged into Harvard.

In the 20th century, Harvard's reputation grew as its endowment burgeoned and prominent intellectuals and professors affiliated with the university. The university's rapid enrollment growth also was a product of both the founding of new graduate academic programs and an expansion of the undergraduate college. Radcliffe College emerged as the female counterpart of Harvard College, becoming one of the most prominent schools for women in the United States. In 1900, Harvard became a founding member of the Association of American Universities.

The student body in its first decades of the 20th century was predominantly "old-stock, high-status Protestants, especially Episcopalians, Congregationalists, and Presbyterians," according to sociologist and author Jerome Karabel. In 1923, a year after the percentage of Jewish students at Harvard reached 20%, President A. Lawrence Lowell supported a policy change that would have capped the admission of Jewish students to 15% of the undergraduate population. But Lowell's idea was rejected. Lowell also refused to mandate forced desegregation in the university's freshman dormitories, writing that, "We owe to the colored man the same opportunities for education that we do to the white man, but we do not owe to him to force him and the white into social relations that are not, or may not be, mutually congenial."

President James B. Conant led the university from 1933 to 1953; Conant reinvigorated creative scholarship in an effort to guarantee Harvard's preeminence among the nation and world's emerging research institutions. Conant viewed higher education as a vehicle of opportunity for the talented rather than an entitlement for the wealthy. As such, he devised programs to identify, recruit, and support talented youth. An influential 268-page report issued by Harvard faculty in 1945 under Conant's leadership, General Education in a Free Society, remains one the most important works in curriculum studies.

Between 1945 and 1960, admissions standardized to open the university to a more diverse group of students; for example, after World War II, special exams were developed so  veterans could be considered for admission. No longer drawing mostly from select New England prep schools, the undergraduate college became accessible to striving middle class students from public schools; many more Jews and Catholics were admitted, but still few Blacks, Hispanics, or Asians versus the representation of these demoraphics in the general population. Throughout the latter half of the 20th century, Harvard incrementally became vastly more diverse.

21st century 
Drew Gilpin Faust, who was dean of Harvard Radcliffe Institute, became Harvard's first female president on July 1, 2007. In 2018, Faust retired and joined the board of Goldman Sachs. 

On July 1, 2018, Lawrence Bacow was appointed Harvard's 29th president. Bacow intends to retire in 2023. On December 15, 2022, Harvard announced that Claudine Gay, a Harvard University political scientist and the dean of Harvard Faculty of Arts and Sciences since 2018, will succeed him.

Campuses

Cambridge 

The Yard contains administrative offices such as University Hall and Massachusetts Hall; libraries such as Widener, Pusey, Houghton, and Lamont; and Memorial Church.

The Yard and adjacent areas include the main academic buildings of the Faculty of Arts and Sciences, including the college, such as Sever Hall and Harvard Hall.

Freshman dormitories are in, or adjacent to, the Yard. Upperclassmen live in the twelve residential housesnine south of the Yard near the Charles River, the others half a mile northwest of the Yard at the Radcliffe Quadrangle (which formerly housed Radcliffe College students). Each house is a community of undergraduates, faculty deans, and resident tutors, with its own dining hall, library, and recreational facilities.

Also in Cambridge are the Law, Divinity (theology), Engineering and Applied Science, Design (architecture), Education, Kennedy (public policy), and Extension schools, as well as the Radcliffe Institute for Advanced Study in Radcliffe Yard.
Harvard also has commercial real estate holdings in Cambridge.

Allston 

Harvard Business School, Harvard Innovation Labs, and many athletics facilities, including Harvard Stadium, are located on a  campus in Allston,
a Boston neighborhood just across the Charles River from the Cambridge campus. The John W. Weeks Bridge, a pedestrian bridge over the Charles River, connects the two campuses.

The university is actively expanding into Allston, where it now owns more land than in Cambridge.
Plans include new construction and renovation for the Business School, a hotel and conference center, graduate student housing, Harvard Stadium, and other athletics facilities.

In 2021, the Harvard John A. Paulson School of Engineering and Applied Sciences will expand into a new, 500,000+ square foot Science and Engineering Complex (SEC) in Allston.
The SEC will be adjacent to the Enterprise Research Campus, the Business School, and the Harvard Innovation Labs to encourage technology- and life science-focused startups as well as collaborations with mature companies.

Longwood 

Several Harvard-affiliated hospitals and research institutes are also in Longwood, including Beth Israel Deaconess Medical Center, Boston Children's Hospital, Brigham and Women's Hospital, Dana–Farber Cancer Institute, Joslin Diabetes Center, and the Wyss Institute for Biologically Inspired Engineering. Additional affiliates, most notably Massachusetts General Hospital, are located throughout the Greater Boston area.

Other 
Harvard owns the Dumbarton Oaks Research Library and Collection in Washington, D.C., Harvard Forest in Petersham, Massachusetts, the Concord Field Station in Estabrook Woods in Concord, Massachusetts,
the Villa I Tatti research center in Florence, Italy,
the Harvard Shanghai Center in Shanghai, China,
and the Arnold Arboretum in the Jamaica Plain neighborhood of Boston.

Organization and administration

Governance 

Harvard is governed by a combination of its Board of Overseers and the President and Fellows of Harvard College (also known as the Harvard Corporation), which in turn appoints the President of Harvard University.
There are 16,000 staff and faculty,
including 2,400 professors, lecturers, and instructors.

The Faculty of Arts and Sciences is the largest Harvard faculty and has primary responsibility for instruction in Harvard College, the Graduate School of Arts and Sciences, the John A. Paulson School of Engineering and Applied Sciences (SEAS), and the Division of Continuing Education, which includes Harvard Summer School and Harvard Extension School. There are nine other graduate and professional faculties as well as the Radcliffe Institute for Advanced Study.

Joint programs with the Massachusetts Institute of Technology include the Harvard–MIT Program in Health Sciences and Technology, the Broad Institute, The Observatory of Economic Complexity, and edX.

Endowment 

Harvard has the largest university endowment in the world, valued at about $50.9 billion as of 2022.
During the recession of 2007–2009, it suffered significant losses that forced large budget cuts, in particular temporarily halting construction on the Allston Science Complex.
The endowment has since recovered.

About $2 billion of investment income is annually distributed to fund operations.
Harvard's ability to fund its degree and financial aid programs depends on the performance of its endowment; a poor performance in fiscal year 2016 forced a 4.4% cut in the number of graduate students funded by the Faculty of Arts and Sciences.
Endowment income is critical, as only 22% of revenue is from students' tuition, fees, room, and board.

Divestment 

Since the 1970s, several student-led campaigns have advocated divesting Harvard's endowment from controversial holdings, including investments in apartheid South Africa, Sudan during the Darfur genocide, and the tobacco, fossil fuel, and private prison industries.

In the late 1980s, during the divestment from South Africa movement, student activists erected a symbolic "shantytown" on Harvard Yard and blockaded a speech by South African Vice Consul Duke Kent-Brown.
The university eventually reduced its South African holdings by $230 million (out of $400 million) in response to the pressure.

Academics

Teaching and learning 

Harvard is a large, highly residential research university
offering 50 undergraduate majors,
134 graduate degrees,
and 32 professional degrees.
During the 2018–2019 academic year, Harvard granted 1,665 baccalaureate degrees, 1,013 graduate degrees, and 5,695 professional degrees.

The four-year, full-time undergraduate program has a liberal arts and sciences focus.
To graduate in the usual four years, undergraduates normally take four courses per semester.
In most majors, an honors degree requires advanced coursework and a senior thesis.
Though some introductory courses have large enrollments, the median class size is 12 students.

Research 
Harvard is a founding member of the Association of American Universities and a preeminent research university with "very high" research activity (R1) and comprehensive doctoral programs across the arts, sciences, engineering, and medicine according to the Carnegie Classification.

With the medical school consistently ranking first among medical schools for research, biomedical research is an area of particular strength for the university. More than 11,000 faculty and over 1,600 graduate students conduct research at the medical school as well as its 15 affiliated hospitals and research institutes. The medical school and its affiliates attracted $1.65 billion in competitive research grants from the National Institutes of Health in 2019, more than twice as much as any other university.

Libraries and museums 

The Harvard Library system is centered in Widener Library in Harvard Yard and comprises nearly 80 individual libraries holding about 20.4 million items.
According to the American Library Association, this makes it the largest academic library in the world.

Houghton Library, the Arthur and Elizabeth Schlesinger Library on the History of Women in America, and the Harvard University Archives consist principally of rare and unique materials. America's oldest collection of maps, gazetteers, and atlases both old and new is stored in Pusey Library and open to the public. The largest collection of East-Asian language material outside of East Asia is held in the Harvard-Yenching Library

The Harvard Art Museums comprise three museums. The Arthur M. Sackler Museum covers Asian, Mediterranean, and Islamic art, the Busch–Reisinger Museum (formerly the Germanic Museum) covers central and northern European art, and the Fogg Museum covers Western art from the Middle Ages to the present emphasizing Italian early Renaissance, British pre-Raphaelite, and 19th-century French art. The Harvard Museum of Natural History includes the Harvard Mineralogical Museum, the Harvard University Herbaria featuring the Blaschka Glass Flowers exhibit, and the Museum of Comparative Zoology. Other museums include the Carpenter Center for the Visual Arts, designed by Le Corbusier and housing the film archive, the Peabody Museum of Archaeology and Ethnology, specializing in the cultural history and civilizations of the Western Hemisphere, and the Harvard Museum of the Ancient Near East featuring artifacts from excavations in the Middle East.

Reputation and rankings

Among overall rankings, the Academic Ranking of World Universities (ARWU) has ranked Harvard as the world's top university every year since it was released.
When QS and Times Higher Education collaborated to publish the Times Higher Education–QS World University Rankings from 2004 to 2009, Harvard held the top spot every year and continued to hold first place on THE World Reputation Rankings ever since it was released in 2011.
In 2019, it was ranked first worldwide by SCImago Institutions Rankings. It was ranked in the first tier of American research universities, along with Columbia, MIT, and Stanford, in the 2019 report from the Center for Measuring University Performance. Harvard University is accredited by the New England Commission of Higher Education.

Among rankings of specific indicators, Harvard topped both the University Ranking by Academic Performance (2019–2020) and Mines ParisTech: Professional Ranking of World Universities (2011), which measured universities' numbers of alumni holding CEO positions in Fortune Global 500 companies.
According to annual polls done by The Princeton Review, Harvard is consistently among the top two most commonly named dream colleges in the United States, both for students and parents.
Additionally, having made significant investments in its engineering school in recent years, Harvard was ranked third worldwide for Engineering and Technology in 2019 by Times Higher Education.

In international relations, Foreign Policy magazine ranks Harvard best in the world at the undergraduate level and second in the world at the graduate level, behind the Edmund A. Walsh School of Foreign Service at Georgetown University.

Student life 

Student life and activities are generally organized within each school.

Student government 

The Undergraduate Council represents College students. The Graduate Council represents students at all twelve graduate and professional schools, most of which also have their own student government.

Athletics 

Both the undergraduate College and the graduate schools have intramural sports programs.

Harvard College competes in the NCAA Division I Ivy League conference. The school fields 42 intercollegiate sports teams, more than any other college in the country. Every two years, the Harvard and Yale track and field teams come together to compete against a combined Oxford and Cambridge team in the oldest continuous international amateur competition in the world. As with other Ivy League universities, Harvard does not offer athletic scholarships. The school color is crimson.

Harvard's athletic rivalry with Yale is intense in every sport in which they meet, coming to a climax each fall in the annual football meeting, which dates back to 1875.

Harvard University Gazette 
The Harvard Gazette, also called the Harvard University Gazette, is the official press organ of Harvard University. Formerly a print publication, it is now a web site. It publicizes research, faculty, teaching and events at the university. Initiated in 1906, it was originally a weekly calendar of news and events. In 1968 it became a weekly newspaper.

When the Gazette was a print publication, it was considered a good way of keeping up with Harvard news: "If weekly reading suits you best, the most comprehensive and authoritative medium is the Harvard University Gazette".

In 2010, the Gazette "shifted from a print-first to a digital-first and mobile-first" publication, and reduced its publication calendar to biweekly, while keeping the same number of reporters, including some who had previously worked for the Boston Globe, Miami Herald, and the Associated Press.

Notable people

Alumni 

Over more than three and a half centuries, Harvard alumni have contributed creatively and significantly to society, the arts and sciences, business, and national and international affairs. Harvard's alumni include eight U.S. presidents, 188 living billionaires, 79 Nobel laureates, 7 Fields Medal winners, 9 Turing Award laureates, 369 Rhodes Scholars, 252 Marshall Scholars, and 13 Mitchell Scholars. Harvard students and alumni have won 10 Academy Awards, 48 Pulitzer Prizes, and 108 Olympic medals (including 46 gold medals), and they have founded many notable companies worldwide.

Faculty

Literature and popular culture 

The perception of Harvard as a center of either elite achievement, or elitist privilege, has made it a frequent literary and cinematic backdrop. "In the grammar of film, Harvard has come to mean both tradition, and a certain amount of stuffiness," film critic Paul Sherman has said.

Literature 
 The Sound and the Fury (1929) and Absalom, Absalom! (1936) by William Faulkner both depict Harvard student life.
 Of Time and the River (1935) by Thomas Wolfe is a fictionalized autobiography that includes his alter ego's time at Harvard.
 The Late George Apley (1937) by John P. Marquand parodies Harvard men at the opening of the 20th century; it won the Pulitzer Prize.
 The Second Happiest Day (1953) by John P. Marquand Jr. portrays the Harvard of the World War II generation.

Film 
Harvard permits filming on its property only rarely, so most scenes set at Harvard (especially indoor shots, but excepting aerial footage and shots of public areas such as Harvard Square) are in fact shot elsewhere.
 Love Story (1970) concerns a romance between a wealthy Harvard hockey player (Ryan O'Neal) and a brilliant Radcliffe student of modest means (Ali MacGraw): it is screened annually for incoming freshmen.
 The Paper Chase (1973)
 A Small Circle of Friends (1980)
 Prozac Nation (2001) is a psychological drama about a 19-year-old Harvard student with atypical depression.

See also 

 2012 Harvard cheating scandal
 Academic regalia of Harvard University
 Gore Hall
 Harvard College social clubs
 Harvard University Police Department
 Harvard University Press
 Harvard/MIT Cooperative Society
 I, Too, Am Harvard
 List of Harvard University named chairs
 List of Nobel laureates affiliated with Harvard University
 List of oldest universities in continuous operation
 Outline of Harvard University
 Secret Court of 1920

Notes

References

Bibliography 

 Abelmann, Walter H., ed. The Harvard-MIT Division of Health Sciences and Technology: The First 25 Years, 1970–1995 (2004). 346 pp.
 Beecher, Henry K. and Altschule, Mark D. Medicine at Harvard: The First 300 Years (1977). 569 pp.
 Bentinck-Smith, William, ed. The Harvard Book: Selections from Three Centuries (2d ed.1982). 499 pp.
 Bethell, John T.; Hunt, Richard M.; and Shenton, Robert. Harvard A to Z (2004). 396 pp. excerpt and text search
 Bethell, John T. Harvard Observed: An Illustrated History of the University in the Twentieth Century, Harvard University Press, 1998, 
 Bunting, Bainbridge. Harvard: An Architectural History (1985). 350 pp.
 Carpenter, Kenneth E. The First 350 Years of the Harvard University Library: Description of an Exhibition (1986). 216 pp.
 Cuno, James et al. Harvard's Art Museums: 100 Years of Collecting (1996). 364 pp.
 Elliott, Clark A. and Rossiter, Margaret W., eds. Science at Harvard University: Historical Perspectives (1992). 380 pp.
 Hall, Max. Harvard University Press: A History (1986). 257 pp.
 Hay, Ida. Science in the Pleasure Ground: A History of the Arnold Arboretum (1995). 349 pp.
 Hoerr, John, We Can't Eat Prestige: The Women Who Organized Harvard; Temple University Press, 1997, 
 Howells, Dorothy Elia. A Century to Celebrate: Radcliffe College, 1879–1979 (1978). 152 pp.
 Keller, Morton, and Phyllis Keller. Making Harvard Modern: The Rise of America's University (2001), major history covers 1933 to 2002 online edition
 Lewis, Harry R. Excellence Without a Soul: How a Great University Forgot Education (2006) 
 Morison, Samuel Eliot. Three Centuries of Harvard, 1636–1936 (1986) 512pp; excerpt and text search
 Powell, Arthur G. The Uncertain Profession: Harvard and the Search for Educational Authority (1980). 341 pp.
 Reid, Robert. Year One: An Intimate Look inside Harvard Business School (1994). 331 pp.
 Rosovsky, Henry. The University: An Owner's Manual (1991). 312 pp.
 Rosovsky, Nitza. The Jewish Experience at Harvard and Radcliffe (1986). 108 pp.
 Seligman, Joel. The High Citadel: The Influence of Harvard Law School (1978). 262 pp.
 Sollors, Werner; Titcomb, Caldwell; and Underwood, Thomas A., eds. Blacks at Harvard: A Documentary History of African-American Experience at Harvard and Radcliffe (1993). 548 pp.
 Trumpbour, John, ed., How Harvard Rules. Reason in the Service of Empire, Boston: South End Press, 1989, 
 Ulrich, Laurel Thatcher, ed., Yards and Gates: Gender in Harvard and Radcliffe History, New York: Palgrave Macmillan, 2004. 337 pp.
 Winsor, Mary P. Reading the Shape of Nature: Comparative Zoology at the Agassiz Museum (1991). 324 pp.
 Wright, Conrad Edick. Revolutionary Generation: Harvard Men and the Consequences of Independence (2005). 298 pp.

External links 

 
 

 
1636 establishments in Massachusetts
Universities and colleges in Middlesex County, Massachusetts
Universities and colleges in Cambridge, Massachusetts
Colonial colleges
Educational institutions established in the 1630s
Private universities and colleges in Massachusetts